"Sometimes" was the third single released from Northern Irish rock band Ash's third studio album, Free All Angels (2001). It was released on 9 July 2001 as two CD singles (the first of which being an enhanced CD), as a 7-inch vinyl (which was limited edition and came with a numbered picture gatefold sleeve), and a DVD single. Although "Sometimes" reached only number 21 on the UK Singles Chart, it helped contribute to increase in sales for Free All Angels. The song also reached number 41 in Ireland.

"Sometimes" is a poetic love song, and is regarded as one of the stand out tracks from the album. The song originally slated to be the second single from the album, but the band opted for the heavier track "Burn Baby Burn" in its place.

The song is almost always present in the live set, and is definitely a fan favourite, showing a different side to the band than that of heavier albums such as 1977 and Meltdown. The song can also be found on the Intergalactic Sonic 7″s hits collection.

B-Sides
The first b-side on CD1 is "Skullfull of Sulphur", a heart-string pulling Wheeler track based around an acoustic guitar. This song has rarely, if ever, been in the band's set list. However, when whispers came in 2004 of an Ash acoustic album, this was one of the track being considered for it.

"So The Story Goes" is also a Wheeler track, and appears as a bonus track on the US version of "Free All Angels".

The first CD2 b-side, "Teenage Kicks" is a cover of the classic The Undertones track, which was later performed on "Later with Jools Holland" by the band. This version of the song stars Undertones' guitarist Damian O'Neill. After John Peel's death in 2004, who was a great supporter of Ash, the band played this song live at Glastonbury 2005 in tribute to him.

Lastly, "Melon Farmer" is a cover of a Lazer-Gun Nun song, a band from Ash's school days. It was originally performed on the "Peel Sessions" as a joke, but was so popular, Ash released it as a b-side and on the "Cosmic Debris" collection. Ash often play this song live in concert, and once did so with the band Lazer-Gun Nun in 1994.

Video
The video for "Sometimes" was directed by Jeff Thomas. It was filmed in Cuba, and basically consists of Tim playing the acoustic guitar on the street while the band drive around in a green car. The action also shows the Cuban model, Arianne playing Tim's girlfriend, breaking up with him while Tim plays the acoustic on the bed. At the end of the video, Tim jumps into the back of the car, and they drive off into the sunset. The shoot was not incident free. At one point, the roof of the building which the band were recording in collapsed. Several crew members when taken to hospital, but they only had minor bumps and bruises.

Bassist Mark Hamilton has said of the video: 'Filmed in Cuba, and with a 'nice piece' of casting! This video shows Tim performing alone with an acoustic as we watch his (video) relationship split. The other Ash members spend the video driving around and looking for him in barber shops and gas stations. Of course they find him and everything's OK, thank God!'

"Sometimes" was also released as a DVD. The DVD featured the single, a stills gallery, lyrics and an Ash discography. It also starred Ash's second 20-minute short, "Episode 2: Back From The Edge".

The CD2 version of the CD contained Version 1.1 of the "Ash Video Mixer" software.

Track listings
All tracks were written and composed by Tim Wheeler except where indicated.

CD1 (Enhanced)
 "Sometimes (Radio Edit)"
 "Skullfull of Sulphur"
 "So The Story Goes"
 "Sometimes" (Video)

CD2
 "Sometimes (Album Version)"
 "Teenage Kicks" (JJ O'Neill)
 "Melon Farmer (Live)" (Lowe/Peak)

DVD
 "Sometimes" (DVD Audio)
 Episode 2: Back from the Edge
 Stills Gallery
 Discography
 Lyrics

7-inch
 "Sometimes (Album version)"
 "So The Story Goes"
 "Skullfull of Sulphur"
 "Teenage Kicks" (JJ O'Neill)

Promo CD
 "Sometimes (Radio edit)"

Charts

References

2001 singles
Ash (band) songs
Songs written by Tim Wheeler
2000 songs